Andrzej Poczobut ( Andrej (Andžej) Pačobut, born 16 April 1973 in Vyalikaya Byerastavitsa) is a Belarusian and Polish journalist and activist of the Polish minority in Belarus. He lives in Hrodna, Belarus.

A correspondent for the Polish newspaper Gazeta Wyborcza, Poczobut has been arrested more than a dozen times by the government of Belarus. In 2011, he was sentenced to a fine and fifteen days in prison for "participation in the unsanctioned protest rally" following the 2010 presidential election. In 2011 and 2012, he was arrested and detained for allegedly libeling President Alexander Lukashenko in his reports. The charges against Poczobut received international condemnation, with groups including the European Parliament, Reporters Without Borders, and Amnesty International issuing statements in his support. He has been arrested again in 2021 and remains in prison as of 2022. He has been described as a political prisoner.

Background
He worked as a journalist for several Belarusian media - Den', Narodnaja Volia, Głos znad Niemna and Magazyn Polski. He also works as a correspondent for the Polish newspaper Gazeta Wyborcza.

He is one of the leaders of the Union of Poles in Belarus.

Protest arrest 
On 19 December 2010, Belarus held a disputed presidential election in which President Alexander Lukashenko was elected to a fourth term, which resulted in widespread opposition protests. On 12 January 2011, the State Security Committee of the Republic of Belarus (KGB) arrested Poczobut for "participation in the unsanctioned protest rally". He was fined 1.75 million Belarusian rubles (US$580) the following day.  The KGB also raided his house and confiscated his computer and documents. Andrzej argued that he was acting as a journalist during the rally. On 11 February, he was tried a second time for the same charge, and given a sentence of fifteen days in prison.

Jerzy Buzek, president of the European Parliament, demanded his release. The US-based Committee to Protect Journalists also protested on his behalf, stating that the organization was "outraged that Andrzej Poczobut was not only convicted on a trumped-up charge but that he has now been given jail time after already receiving a sentence of a fine".

In March 2011 the Belarusian government told him that if he did not stop reporting on the administration of Alexander Lukashenko, he would be prosecuted. His accreditation from the Belarus Ministry of Foreign Affairs was revoked. He argued that his work is protected by his constitutional rights.

2011–2012 libel charges 
Poczobut was arrested again on 6 April 2011, this time on libel charges. The charges stemmed from ten reports about the president Poczobut had published on his blog, in Gazeta Wyborcza, and on the website Belaruspartisan.org.

The Union of Poles in Belarus campaigned on Poczobut's behalf, calling for his release. Another Polish journalist, Ihar Bantsar, was sentenced to five days in prison for covering the trial. According to Reporters Without Borders (RSF), reporters for Reuters and the Associated Press were assaulted by plainclothes police officers when attempting to photograph Poczobut entering the courthouse.

On 5 July 2011, he was found guilty and given a suspended three-year prison sentence. Poczobut attributed the suspension of his sentence to international pressure, including a statement on his behalf by the EU. Amnesty International also denounced Poczobut's prosecution and named him a prisoner of conscience. RSF called for his conviction to be overturned, calling him "a -watched victim of President Lukashenko's persecution of journalists". Poczobut appealed the verdict, but lost the appeal on 20 September.

In November 2011, the Polish radio station Radio ZET awarded him its Andrzej Wojciechowski prize for his journalism. Because Poczobut was forbidden to leave Belarus, his wife accepted the award on his behalf.

On 21 June 2012, he was arrested in Grodno on another charge of libel against the president, this time for a story criticizing the government's handling of the 2011 Minsk Metro bombing for the independent news site Charter 97. The charge carried a maximum sentence of five years' imprisonment. 
Poczobut was released on bail after a week in detention, but was told a trial against him would still be forthcoming.

The European Parliament adopted a resolution urging that the charges against Pozcobut be dropped. Polish Prime Minister Donald Tusk summoned the Belarusian ambassador to object to the libel case, and stated that he also had the backing of the Czech Republic, Slovakia, and Hungary. RSF again protested the charges, describing Poczobut as "hounded because of his determination to work as an independent reporter", and Amnesty International called for the charges to be dropped. PEN American Center also appealed on his behalf, urging the Belarusian government "to drop all charges against Pozcobut immediately, and to uphold their obligations to protect freedom of expression for all citizens as guaranteed by Article 19 of the International Covenant on Civil and Political Rights."

2021 extremism charges 
As a part of the crackdown on the Union of Poles in Belarus, he was arrested again on March 25, 2021. High Representative of the Union for Foreign Affairs and Security Policy Josep Borrell condemned the arrest. In February 2023 he was sentenced to 8 years in labour camp.

Personal life 
Poczobut is married to Aksana Poczobut. He has a daughter (born c. 2001) and a son (born February 2011).

See also 
 Censorship in Belarus
 Media of Belarus
 Aleksandr Otroschenkov

References

External links
Blogs by Andrzej Poczobut:
 Livejournal blog in Belarusian
 Blog in Russian at Belaruspartisan.org

1973 births
Amnesty International prisoners of conscience held by Belarus
Belarusian journalists
Belarusian bloggers
Soviet people of Polish descent
Belarusian people of Polish descent
People from Byerastavitsa District
Living people
Union of Poles in Belarus
Belarusian prisoners and detainees
Belarusian political prisoners